Piero Sacerdoti (Milan, December 6, 1905 – Saint Moritz, December 30, 1966) was an Italian insurer and university professor, general manager of Riunione Adriatica di Sicurtà in Milan from 1949 to his death.

Biography 
Son of  Ing. Nino Sacerdoti and Margherita Donati, daughter of  Lazzaro Donati, after his high school graduation at Liceo Parini in Milan, he graduated cum laude at Milan Law School with a thesis on administrative law «The trade unions association in Italian law», printed by «Edizioni Lavoro» in 1928 and the following year also cum laude at the Faculty of Economics and Social Sciences of the University of Pavia.

In 1929 he passed the Law Bar examination and in 1931 he received the university habilitation to teach labor law after he published his book  «The trade unions association in public German law».

In 1928 he was recruited by Assicuratrice Italiana of RAS (Riunione Adriatica di Sicurtà) Group (later merged into Allianz) following the publication of two articles in the Italian economic newspaper Il Sole (merged in 1965 into Il Sole 24 Ore) on the German financial situation. In 1933 he was appointed deputy director of the company and was given the task to develop foreign activities in Spain, Switzerland, France and Belgium.

The CEO of RAS Arnoldo Frigessi di Rattalma appointed him in 1936 director of Protectrice –Accidents and Protectrice-Vie in Paris, both companies controlled by RAS. In 1940, following the German occupation of Paris, the direction of Protectrice group moved to Marseille, and in  February 1943 to Nice, under Italian occupation, when the Germans occupied Southern France.

On August 14, 1940 he married in Marseille Ilse Klein, daughter of Siegmund and Helene Klein of Cologne, Germany, from whom he had four sons; the best man was his parents' first cousin Angelo Donati.

After September 8, 1943, persecuted by the Nazis for his Jewish religion, he succeeded  in taking refuge in Switzerland with his wife Ilse, his son Giorgio and his parents.

In Geneva he taught Italian administrative law in the academic program organized by Geneva's University for Italian students who had taken refuge in Switzerland after the Armistice. 
Other teachers were famous professors as  Luigi Einaudi ( economic and financial politics), Gustavo del Vecchio ( economic politics), Francesco Carnelutti ( general theory of law), Amintore Fanfani ( economic history), Donato  Donati (Italian constitutional law).

After Paris liberation in 1945 he went back to France and took back his functions at Protectrice, which had rapidly grown in size, and was ranked in order of importance immediately after  the French nationalized companies.  
In 1947 his activity was  rewarded with the appointment to the position of General Manager. 
In 1949, at age 43, Sacerdoti was appointed General Manager of RAS in Milan and maintained this position until his sudden death from heart attack in 1966.

Professional activity part 1
He promoted the installation of new powerful computers for the management of the company and the move of its Milan's headquarters from its previous location in via Manzoni 38, to a new building in  Corso Italia 23, now the Italian headquarters of Allianz Group.
The new building, planned by architects  Giò Ponti and Piero Portaluppi, was inaugurated by the then archbishop of Milano Cardinal Montini, later Pope Paul VI on May 19, 1962. 

He participated to the project as a protagonist with precise directions in order to meet rigorous functionality criteria based on  his management experience and extensive visits to the most modern offices of insurance companies built in Europe in those years.

In Italy the new RAS Headquarters was the first office building created  after the Second World War as the headquarters of a bank or an insurance company and remains in Milan among the best examples of business architecture, together with the other buildings by Gio Ponti for the headquarters of Montecatini, Edison S.p.A., RAI and Pirelli Tower.

Among the innovations introduced by him in the company's products, worth mentioning are the global policies, which allow the cover of many risks with only one calculation of the premium, the preliminary estimate of the risk in the fire insurance, the automatic revision of the risks in the insurances for civil risks, the doubling of the life capital in case of accident, the guarantee of the payment of debts in case of death,  the participation of policy holders to the profits of the life branch, the doubling in the event of death of the savings deposits at the Cassa di Risparmio delle Province Lombarde,  the group life insurance for the employees of the same company, the increase every three years of insured life capitals with a reduced rate, the insurance against the risk of machine  assembly, the hail insurance for citrus grove.

He introduced an insurance cover for the COFINA savings plans of installment shares purchases with a multiyear commitment, created in 1956, to guarantee to heirs the completion of the investment program in case of death of the investor during the commitment period.

In 1954 he became professor of  Labor law at the Università degli Studi di Milano, an appointment that he relinquished in 1964 because of his increased professional commitments.

In 1963 Sacerdoti became head of the foreign organization of RAS group and named the company «The Company of the Five Continents», opening new offices and branches around the world and visiting all the foreign head offices and affiliated companies in little less than two years.

Under his management (1950–1965) the volume of insurance premiums of the RAS Group recorded an increase of 482% and those of RAS alone of 285%.

Professional activity part 2
Piero Sacerdoti was defined by the important French business magazine «L’Argus» «insurer of European spirit and world renown».

He was one of the most influential members of the Italian  Insurance Companies Association trade group(ANIA) and of the  Consulting Commission for Insurances at the Ministry of Industry, Commerce e Craft. He was a strong supporter of insurance information and public relations, and was the promoter of the Insurance Study Center in Milan, called after him after his death (Centro Studi Assicurativi Piero Sacerdoti).

He was among the initiators in 1953 and most qualified representatives of the Comité Européen des Assurances  (CEA), which represents the global interests of the European industry. He was an advocate of the liberalization of services and enterprises solvency.

He studied since 1957 the risk of damage to third parties in the pacific exploitation of nuclear power and participated in 1957 to the works of OEEC (Organisation for Economic Co-operation and Development) for the preparation of an international convention, signed in 1960, to avoid legal disparities in nuclear industry insurance among the various European countries. He encouraged the creation of a nuclear insurance  Italian “pool”, associated to similar foreign “pools”, to provide to the Italian nuclear industry the maximum guarantee for damages to third parties available on the international market.
In 1959 he signed the first Italian policy for insurance of nuclear damages, related to the subcritical experimental reactor of the Cagliari University.

He was concerned with the institution of a guarantee fund to compensate the victims of unknown or insolvent car drivers, but he opposed, at least at the beginning, a compulsory insurance for car drivers, fearing government interference in the private management of companies.

Concerning the retirement system, he promoted the creation of voluntary retirements plans to integrate the compulsory public retirement system.

Writings and commemoration

Many are  Prof. Sacerdoti’s writings in the insurance field in professional journals, magazines and newspapers. Among the others we mention the study on the possibilities of insurance development in Africa (1952), the historic treatment on the «Private insurances in Lombardy» (1954), «The insurances on guarantees in the Italian insurance market » (1956), «The insurance of risks in installment sales» (1956), «The insurance of credit risks in the installment sale of equipment goods» (1958), «The insurances in the foreign commerce» (1957), the study published on Sole newspaper dedicated to «One century of insurance activity in Italian economy (1865-1965) », the articles published on the situation of the Italian insurance industry at the beginning of every year on Sole of Milan and various foreign magazines, the book published by Centro Studi Assicurativi on the insurance technique, the studies for the reform of social security in Italy and on Car Drivers Insurance .
 
His death, which came suddenly from a heart attack, was accompanied by unanimous expression of sorrow by the Italian and International insurance and financial world.

Senator Eugenio Artom, Chairman of The Italian Association of Insurance  Companies (ANIA), commemorated him with these words on January 10, 1967:
«He was a personality that left a sign of himself – wherever he passed – for the elevation of mind, the richness of culture, his prodigious activity, the passion – above all – that he put so vividly, so warmly in all he did, in all he created  . In the field of industry, in the field of the formation of new International and super national organizations, in the creation of new tools to prepare young people to the insurance life, everywhere he left the sign of his power, while the fact that he has been able, for ten years of his life, to join to the activity of a man operating in the business field – and operating with such a wide responsibility and such a high commitment – the meditated fruitful activity of law professor in a university, fully reveals the varied capacity of this complex, vigorous personality.»

Notes

Honours
 Commendatore of the Italian Republic, 1953
 Chevalier of the Legion of Honor, 1954
 Gold medal of Milan Municipality to the memory, 1968

Sources 
  Giandomenico Piluso, Sacerdoti Piero, Dizionario Biografico degli Italiani, Enciclopedia Treccani, pag. 548-551, Roma, 2017
 Giorgio Sacerdoti, Piero Sacerdoti. Un uomo di pensiero e azione alla guida della Riunione Adriatica di Sicurtà. Lettere familiari e altre memorie, Hoepli, 2019, 
 Piero Sacerdoti, L’associazione sindacale nel diritto italiano, Roma, Edizioni del diritto del lavoro, 1928
 Piero Sacerdoti, Le associazioni sindacali nel diritto pubblico germanico, Padova, Cedam, 1931
 Piero Sacerdoti, Le Corporatisme et le regime de la production et du travail en Italie, Paris, Librairie du Recueil Sirey, 1938
 Piero Sacerdoti, Il cittadino e lo stato, corso di diritto amministrativo tenuto a Ginevra nel 1944
 Piero Sacerdoti, Le assicurazioni private nella regione Lombardia, estratto dal volume L'economia della regione Lombardia, Cariplo, 1954
 Piero Sacerdoti, La responsabilità civile per danni a terzi nell'utilizzazione pacifica dell'energia nucleare, Casa Editrice la Tribuna, Piacenza, 1958
 Piero Sacerdoti, L'atomo e il diritto, Realtà nuova, rivista dei Rotary Club d'Italia, n. 7 1958
 Piero Sacerdoti, Risarcimento obbligatorio del danno alle vittime della circolazione dei veicoli a motore, intervento al dibattito televisivo "Che ne dite?" della Televisione italiana del 6-2-1959
 Piero Sacerdoti, Il nostro programma per gli anni '60, Convegno degli Agenti Ras, Milano, 30 maggio 1962
 La Compagnia dei 5 Continenti, Riunione Adriatica di Sicurtà, 1963
 Piero Sacerdoti, Previdenza sociale e promozione del risparmio nell'economia moderna, ALDAI, Milano, 2-2-1964
 Piero Sacerdoti, Insurance in the Common Market, lecture given at the Fifth Course on the Law and Economy of the European Communities by the International Centre for Research and Documentation on the European Communities, Milano, 12 maggio 1966
 Piero Sacerdoti, L'industrie de l'assurance italienne vers l'horizon 1970, L'Argus journal international des assurances, Paris, January 15, 1967
 The Times, London, Professor Piero Sacerdoti, obituary of January 6, 1967
 La réassurance, Paris, Nécrologie de M. Piero Sacerdoti, January 1967, n. 587
 Technical Bulletin of Ras Group, issue dedicated to Piero Sacerdoti's memory, year 35, n. 2, February 1967
 Giorgio Sacerdoti, Falls wir uns nicht wiedersehen…Die Familie von Siegmund Klein zwischen Rettung und Tod, Prospero Verlag, Münster, Berlin, 2010, 
 Giorgio Sacerdoti, Nel caso non ci rivedessimo, una famiglia tra deportazione e salvezza 1938-1945, Archinto, 2013 
 Erminio Tedeschi, Appunti per una storia, Ras: 1838-1988, Milano, Ras, giugno 1989 in occasione del 150° bilancio della Ras

External links 
 Allianz SpA website, in which RAS was merged in 2007
 Anna Millo, Trieste, le assicurazioni, l’Europa, Arnoldo Frigessi di Rattalma e la RAS, Franco Angeli, 2004

1905 births
1966 deaths
Businesspeople in insurance
Italian legal scholars
20th-century Italian Jews
Businesspeople from Milan
Chevaliers of the Légion d'honneur
Jews who emigrated to escape Nazism